Bobrov's bent-toed gecko (Cyrtodactylus bobrovi) is a species of lizard in the family Gekkonidae. The species is endemic to Vietnam.

Etymology
The specific name, bobrovi is in honor of Russian herpetologist Vladimir V. Bobrov.

Geographic range
C. bobrovi is found in northwestern Vietnam, in Hoa Binh Province.

Habitat

Description

References

Further reading
Nguyen TQ, Le MD, Pham AV, Ngo HN, Hoang CV, Pham CT, Ziegler T (2015). "Two new species of Cyrtodactylus (Squamata: Gekkonidae) from the karst forest of Hoa Binh Province, Vietnam". Zootaxa 3985 (3): 375–390. (Cyrtodactylus bobrovi, new species).

Cyrtodactylus
Reptiles described in 2015